Guo Lei (born April 26, 1982 in Baoding, Hebei) is a male Chinese judoka who competed at the 2008 Summer Olympics in the Half middleweight (73–81 kg) event.

Major performances
2003 National Championships - 1st;
2006 National Champions Tournament - 1st;
2006 Asian Games - 3rd

See also
China at the 2008 Summer Olympics

References
 http://2008teamchina.olympic.cn/index.php/personview/personsen/585 

1982 births
Living people
Judoka at the 2008 Summer Olympics
Olympic judoka of China
Sportspeople from Baoding
Asian Games medalists in judo
Judoka at the 2006 Asian Games
Chinese male judoka
Asian Games bronze medalists for China
Medalists at the 2006 Asian Games
21st-century Chinese people